Elise, or Real Life is a 1970 French drama film directed by Michel Drach. It was entered into the 1970 Cannes Film Festival.

Cast
 Marie-José Nat as Elise Le Tellier
 Mohamed Chouikh as Arezki
 Bernadette Lafont as Anna
 Jean-Pierre Bisson as Lucien Le Tellier
 Catherine Allégret as Didi
 Mustapha Chadly as Mustapha
 Alice Reichen as La grand-mère
 Martine Chevallier as Marie-Louise, the sister-in-law
 Jean-Pierre Darras as Le commissaire
 Yves Barsacq as Un policier

References

External links

1970 films
1970 drama films
French drama films
1970s French-language films
Films directed by Michel Drach
1970s French films